Hugo da Silva Cabral (born 6 September 1988), sometimes known as just Hugo, is a Brazilian footballer who plays as a forward for Santa Cruz.

Career
On 2 January 2019, Ponte Preta announced that they had signed Cabral on loan from Tombense.

References

External links

1988 births
Living people
People from São João de Meriti
Sportspeople from Rio de Janeiro (state)
Brazilian footballers
Brazilian expatriate footballers
Association football forwards
Campeonato Brasileiro Série A players
Campeonato Brasileiro Série B players
Campeonato Brasileiro Série C players
Campeonato Brasileiro Série D players
Saudi First Division League players
Olaria Atlético Clube players
Macaé Esporte Futebol Clube players
Americano Futebol Clube players
Ceará Sporting Club players
Bangu Atlético Clube players
Clube Náutico Capibaribe players
Esporte Clube Bahia players
Joinville Esporte Clube players
Volta Redonda FC players
Avaí FC players
Criciúma Esporte Clube players
Tombense Futebol Clube players
São Bernardo Futebol Clube players
Luverdense Esporte Clube players
Grêmio Osasco Audax Esporte Clube players
América Futebol Clube (MG) players
Esporte Clube Santo André players
Centro Sportivo Alagoano players
Associação Atlética Ponte Preta players
Cuiabá Esporte Clube players
Ituano FC players
Ermis Aradippou FC players
Associação Atlética Portuguesa (RJ) players
Al-Okhdood Club players
Brazilian expatriate sportspeople in Cyprus
Expatriate footballers in Cyprus
Brazilian expatriate sportspeople in Saudi Arabia
Expatriate footballers in Saudi Arabia